Chinna Mul Peria Mul is 1981 Indian Tamil-language crime thriller film directed by N. S. Rajbharath and produced by Indra. The film stars Raja Alfred, Sreenath and Shanthi Krishna, with Jayaram, Madhan Veerappan, Sumangali, Vani and Baby Anju in supporting roles. It was released on 18 September 1981.

Plot 

A blind woman Radha's roommate Usha is murdered by a man, who leaves behind his bracelet. Radha stumbles upon the bracelet and reads the man's name – Anand – on it via Braille. When Anand returns to collect the bracelet, Radha, having anticipated he would come to murder her as well, stabs him in the stomach with scissors.

Cast 
Male cast
 Raja Alfred as Anand
 Sreenath as Dr. Arun
 Jayaram as Justice Madhana Gopal
 Madhan as Inspector Kumar
 Veerappan as Krishnamoorthy

Female cast
 Shanthi Krishna as Radha
 Sumangali as Usha
 Vani as Dolly's mother
 Baby Anju as Dolly

Soundtrack 
Music composed by Shankar–Ganesh.

Reception 
Nalini Sastry of Kalki praised Rajbharath's direction for maintaining the thrill and suspense.

References

External links 
 

1980s crime thriller films
1980s psychological thriller films
1980s Tamil-language films
1981 films
Films directed by N. S. Rajbharath
Films scored by Shankar–Ganesh
Indian crime thriller films
Tamil-language psychological thriller films